Frida Leonhardsen Maanum (born 16 July 1999) is a Norwegian professional footballer who plays as a midfielder or defender for FA WSL club Arsenal and the Norway national team.

Club career

2014–2016: Lightning 
Maanum played youth football for Bærumløkka, Stabæk, and eventually Lyn. She was part of a talented age-specific team in Lyn, together with Heidi Ellingsen and Andrea Wilmann, among others. The team won both the Dana Cup and the Norway Cup in 2014. In the autumn of 2014, she made her debut for Lyn's A team in the 1st division. As a 16-year-old, in 2015 she was on a training stay at the big Germany club VfL Wolfsburg, where she received very good feedback.

2017: Stabæk 
In the winter of 2017, she went to Stabæk in the Toppserien. She played all the games for Stabæk in the spring season, before it became known in August that she announced a transfer to Swedish Linköpings FC after only half a season in Stabæk.

2017–2021: Linköping 
She joined Linköpings FC in Sweden in 2017, at the age of 18. She would win the 2017 Damallsvenskan title in her first season with the club. In her first season in Linköping, she helped win the series championship in the Damallsvenskan. She became a key player in the Swedish top club. She scored three goals in ten games during the 2021 Damallsvenskan season, serving as the club's captain. She scored in her final game for the club in June 2021, a 4–1 victory over Örebro. Before the 2021 season, at the age of 21, she was named the team's captain. When the local newspaper Corren in May 2021 named the 30 best Linköping players of all time, they placed Maanum in 14th place.

2021–: Arsenal 
On 27 July 2021 it was announced that Maanum had signed a deal to join English FA WSL side Arsenal. She quickly established herself in the first team of her new club, and Arsenal coach Jonas Eidevall stated, "I knew she was good, but she was better than I expected." On 5 October 2021, she scored her first goal for Arsenal in a Champions League match against Barcelona. Despite a very good start at his new club, there was significantly less playing time the following spring. She was nevertheless nominated as "young player of the year" in the Women's Super League 2021/22.

National team career 
Maanum has national matches for U16, U17, U19, U23, and the Norwegian senior national team.

At the age of 17, she was selected for the squad at the UEFA European Championship 2017 in Netherlands. At this point, she had only played 10 matches at the top level in Norway. She made her debut on the senior national team on 11 July 2017, when she started the dress rehearsal before the Euro against France. Less than a week later on her 18th birthday, 16 July 2017, she started Norway's opening match at the Euro against the host country the Netherlands.

In October 2020, she scored the game-winning goal against Wales to qualify Norway for the 2022 Euros.

She was also in Norway's squad for the World Cup in France 2019 and the Euro in England 2022.

In November 2022 she was again part of Norway's team who held England to a draw with her equaliser. England's Lionesses had been unbeaten in 2022 and this friendly was their last match of the year.

Personal life 
Maanum is in a relationship with Swedish footballer Emma Lennartsson.

Career statistics

Club

International
Scores and results list Norway's goal tally first, score column indicates score after each Maanum goal.

Honours 
Linköping
 Damallsvenskan: 2017
Arsenal

 FA Women's League Cup: 2022–23

Norway
 Algarve Cup: 2019

References

External links
 

1999 births
Living people
Sportspeople from Bærum
Norwegian women's footballers
Norway women's international footballers
Stabæk Fotball Kvinner players
Linköpings FC players
Women's association football defenders
Women's association football midfielders
2019 FIFA Women's World Cup players
Damallsvenskan players
Expatriate women's footballers in Sweden
UEFA Women's Euro 2022 players
Norwegian LGBT sportspeople
LGBT association football players
Lesbian sportswomen
21st-century LGBT people
UEFA Women's Euro 2017 players